Recursive indexing is an algorithm used to represent large numberic values using members of a relatively small set.

Recursive indexing writes the successive differences of the number after extracting the maximum value of the alphabet set from the number, and continuing recursively till the difference falls in the range of the set.

Recursive indexing with a 2-letter alphabet is called unary code.

Encoding
To encode a number N, keep reducing the maximum element of this set (Smax) from N and output Smax for each such difference, stopping when the number lies in the half closed half open
range [0 – Smax).

Example 
Let S = [0 1 2 3 4 … 10], be an 11-element set, and we have to recursively index the value N=49.

According to this method, subtract 10 from 49 and iterate until the difference is a number in the 0–10 range.

The values are 10 (N = 49 – 10 = 39), 10 (N = 39 – 10 = 29), 10 (N = 29 – 10 = 19), 10 (N = 19 – 10 = 9), 9. The recursively indexed sequence for N = 49 with set S, is 10, 10, 10, 10, 9.

Decoding
Compute the sum of the index values.

Example 
Decoding the above example involves  10 + 10 + 10 + 10 + 9 = 49.

Uses
This technique is most commonly used in run-length encoding systems to encode longer runs than the alphabet sizes permit.

References
 Khalid Sayood, Introduction to Data Compression 3rd ed, Morgan Kaufmann.

Coding theory
Data compression
Lossless compression algorithms